"The Corps, and the Corps, and the Corps" may refer to:

 Refrain of West Point hymn "The Corps", or "The Corps! The Corps! The Corps!"
 Close of retirement speech of Gen. Douglas MacArthur